The Pistole vz. 82 is a compact semi-automatic pistol made for the Czechoslovakian military.  "vz." is an abbreviation for "vzor", which translates to "model."  A civilian export version is called the CZ 83.

Overview 
Manufactured by the Czechoslovak firm Česká zbrojovka the vz. 82 replaced the 7.62×25mm Tokarev vz. 52 pistol in Czechoslovak military service in 1983. It is a compact, single/double-action, semi-automatic pistol with a conventional blowback action.  This type of action allows the barrel to remain solidly fixed to the frame, resulting in improved accuracy over pistols with pivoting barrels (like the U.S. M1911 series). The low bore axis of the vz. 82 provides for less muzzle rise and quicker follow-up shots.  For added convenience, both the frame-mounted thumb safety and the magazine release are ambidextrous.  The vz. 82 was the first service pistol to feature both these features.  The bore is chrome plated, which gives it three advantages: longer barrel life, resistance to rust from the use of corrosive ammunition, and ease of cleaning.  Another feature of this pistol is the use of polygonal rifling in the barrel bore.  This replaces the traditional lands and grooves rifling design with a rounded, smooth polygonal pattern which has a more "hills and valleys" appearance.
The CZ 83 was set to discontinued/limited production status by CZ USA in 2012.

Caliber
The Vz. 82 was made in 9×18mm only while the CZ 83 is available in a variety of finishes and chamberings:
 .32 ACP (aka 7.65mm Browning) - 15-round magazine capacity.  Grooved rifling.
 .380 ACP (aka 9mm Browning Short) - 12-round magazine. Grooved rifling.  (13-round if a 9×18mm Makarov magazine is used). The standard Vz. 82 magazine fits the CZ-83 in .380 ACP without alteration .
 9mm Makarov - 12-round magazine. Produced 1999 - 2001.  Polygonal rifling.

Curio and relic
The vz. 82 was added to the US government's "Curio and Relic" list with the Bureau of Alcohol, Tobacco, Firearms, and Explosives (BATFE) in February 2007, after an individual wrote a letter to the ATF attaching a letter from a federal museum curator who stated that the vz. 82 had "museum interest" as a curio and relic.

Users

 (Phasing out. Being replaced by CZ 75. Now usually used by reservists)
: Forest Rangers
: Law enforcement
: Used in Gulf War
 - Imported during early 1990s, used by elite units of National Guard and Police 
: 20 CZ-83 pistols were bought in 1998 for Ministry of Internal Affairs

: The 9×18mm Makarov model of CZ 83 was imported in the 1980s, and now still in use with People's Army of Vietnam and Vietnam People's Public Security
 30,150 Pistole vz. 82 were gifted from Czech Republic as part of a military package in response to the 2022 Russian invasion of Ukraine.

References

External links
English translation from a Czech book about pistols
 Basic data on Czech army page

9×18mm Makarov semi-automatic pistols
.32 ACP semi-automatic pistols
.380 ACP semi-automatic pistols
Semi-automatic pistols of Czechoslovakia
Simple blowback firearms
Weapons and ammunition introduced in 1983